Dante Rigo (born 11 December 1998) is a Belgian professional footballer who plays as a midfielder for Belgian club Beerschot.

Career
He formerly played for Sparta Rotterdam.

Rigo made his professional debut as Jong PSV player in the Eerste Divisie on 12 August 2016 against SC Cambuur. He played the full game. Rigo played his first game for PSV in September 2017, when PSV played a domestic cup match against SDC Putten.

In June 2019, Rigo signed a new contract with the club until summer 2022 and joined Eredivisie club Sparta Rotterdam on loan.

In August 2020, Rigo joined ADO Den Haag on a season-long loan.

On 4 January 2022, Rigo left PSV and signed for Beerschot on a contract until the end of the season, with the option of a further year.

Career statistics

Honours
PSV
Eredivisie: 2017–18
Johan Cruyff Shield: 2016

Belgium U17
FIFA U-17 World Cup third place: 2015

References

External links
 
 
 

1998 births
Living people
People from Tremelo
Footballers from Flemish Brabant
Belgian footballers
Association football midfielders
PSV Eindhoven players
Jong PSV players
Sparta Rotterdam players
ADO Den Haag players
K Beerschot VA players
Eredivisie players
Eerste Divisie players
Belgian Pro League players
Belgium under-21 international footballers
Belgium youth international footballers
Belgian expatriate footballers
Expatriate footballers in the Netherlands
Belgian expatriate sportspeople in the Netherlands